The 1999 Rink Hockey World Championship was the 34th edition of the Rink Hockey World Championship, held between 4 and 12 June 1999, in Reus, Catalonia, Spain. It was disputed by 12 teams.

Format

The competition was disputed by 12 countries, divided in two groups of 6 teams each one.

Every game lasted 40 minutes, divided in 2 parts of 20 minutes.

Matches

Group stage

Group A

Group B

Championship Knockout stage

5th place bracket

9th to 12th place stage

Final standings

References

External links
Official (Archived 2009-07-22)

Roller Hockey World Cup
World Championship
Rink Hockey World Championship
Rink Hockey World Championship
International roller hockey competitions hosted by Spain
Sport in Reus